A smoke-in is a protest in favor of cannabis rights or more specifically legalization of cannabis.

The Youth International Party (YIP) organized "smoke-ins" across North America through the 1970s and into the 1980s. The first YIP smoke-in was attended by 25,000 in Washington, D.C. on July 4, 1970. There was a culture clash when many of the hippie protesters strolled en masse into the nearby "Honor America Day" festivities with Billy Graham and Bob Hope.

On August 7, 1971, a Yippie smoke-in in Vancouver was attacked by police, resulting in the Gastown Riot, one of the most famous protests in Canadian history.

The annual July 4 Yippie smoke-in in Washington, D.C., became a counterculture tradition. Other smoke-ins as protests for cannabis law reform have been held in the 1960s in London; and through the 1990s at least at the U.S. Capitol, and in and around Austin, Texas.

References

Sources

External links 

 

Cannabis events
Direct action